Track & Field Sports Complex is a multi-use stadium in Bandar Seri Begawan, Brunei. It is currently used mostly for football matches, track and field games. The stadium holds 1,700 people.

References 

Football venues in Brunei Darussalam
Brunei
Multi-purpose stadiums